Marudhamalai is a 2007 Indian Tamil-language action comedy film written and directed by Suraj. The film stars Arjun, Meera and Vadivelu, while Lal, Raghuvaran, Nassar play supporting roles.  The film was released on 7 September 2007. During its release, this film had a grand opening and it became a super-hit at the box office. Vadivelu won the Tamil Nadu State Film Award for Best Comedian for his work in this film.

Plot
Marudhamalai (Arjun), goes to work as Constable in the town of Nachiapuram after passing his police training by getting a merit selection. Here he meets 'Encounter' Ekambaram (Vadivelu), his senior officer. He is asked to do all sorts of petty work for him, and one day, Marudhamalai loses a convict on the way to the court due to Ekambaram's soft heart. He then is to clean the floors of the inspector's house, and there he falls in love with Divya (Meera). Then, later in the market, after Ekambaram is humiliated by a beggar, Marudhamalai sees Maasi (Lal), the 'boss' of the city, killing a person who stood for a candidate in the elections. That constituency has not had an MLA for the last 16 years due to Maasi. Maasi's caste people have been 70% majority in that Nachiyarpuram MLA constituency, but the Government named the constituency as a Reserved Constituency 16 years ago. Since then, Maasi either postpones the MLA election by murdering a candidate or makes sure that his house servant from a lower caste is elected as MLA and then resigns immediately to cause a vacancy of the office. Since Maasi has his caste's support and heavy income, the Government has kept ignoring him.

Then the Chief election commissioner SuryaNarayanan IAS comes to the town. He meets and challenges Maasi to stop him from holding by-elections in that area. Then, during the election day, despite a lot of security, Maasi's men, with the help of a man who acts as a guard, come and drive away from the people who came for voting and are about to kill the commissioner, when Marudhamalai's father (Nassar) slaps Maasi for creating violence. At that time, Marudhamalai comes, beats up Maasi's men, and humiliates Maasi in front of all the people by handcuffing him with his dhoti. Maasi is then arrested and sentenced for 15 days imprisonment without bail.

For his bravery, Marudhamalai is initially suspended, but then promoted to the inspector of the station. With 12 days remaining in Maasi's imprisonment, Marudhamalai seals off his illegal sources of income, and arrests Maasi's henchmen for choking his empire. To exact revenge, Maasi's brother kills Marudhamalai's father by car-bomb. Later, he kills Maasi's two brothers using various unofficial methods, and Maasi vows to kill him the day he is released. Later, as Maasi is released, Marudhamalai gets an order to kill him. He fights the men single-handedly and kills them all, proving his bravery. Marudhamalai is further promoted as DSP.

Cast

Arjun as Inspector Marudhamalai (formerly constable) 
Vadivelu as Encounter Ekambaram 
Meera as Divya 
Raghuvaran as Suryanarayanan IAS, Election commissioner 
Lal as Maasi
Nassar as Marudhamalai's father
Kalairani as Marudhamalai's mother
Dhandapani as Puli
Shanmugarajan as Shanmugarajan
Thyagu as Inspector
Madhan Bob as Doctor
M. N. Rajam as Divya's grandmother
Singamuthu as Vegetable seller
Bonda Mani as Beggar
Mahanadi Shankar as Pickpocket
Krishnamoorthy as Maatturavi
Bose Venkat as Massi' brother
Rajesh as CI and Divya's father
Crane Manohar as Thief
Santhana Bharathi
V. M. Subburaj as Saarapaambu
Sharan Preeth
Priyanka as Bride
Mumaith Khan as Jalaja (Special appearance)

Soundtrack
The soundtrack features six songs composed by D. Imman and lyrics penned by P. Vijay and Thabu Shankar. This is Imman's 25th film as a music composer in both background score and music.

Release
The film released on 7 September 2007. The satellite rights of the film were sold to Kalaignar. The comedy track of this movie with Vadivelu was a huge success and is still a regular on the television channels.

Critical reception
Behindwoods wrote, "On the whole a good fun filled first half and illogical second half explains Marudhamalai." Sify wrote: "It is a mass movie laced with all essential ingredients that will work big time at the box-office." Rediff called it "yet another potboiler about an upright young police constable single-handedly wiping out goondas and rowdies, armed with a bare minimum of weaponry and lethal fists."

References

External links
 

2007 action comedy films
2007 films
Indian action comedy films
2000s Tamil-language films
Films scored by D. Imman
2000s masala films
2007 comedy films
Indian police films